"The Gambler" is a song written by Don Schlitz and recorded by several artists, most famously by American country singer Kenny Rogers.

Schlitz wrote the song in August 1976 when he was 23 years old. It took two years of shopping the song around Nashville before Bobby Bare recorded it on his album Bare at the urging of Shel Silverstein. Bare's version did not catch on and was never released as a single, so Schlitz recorded it himself, but that version failed to chart higher than No. 65. Other musicians took notice and recorded the song in 1978, including Johnny Cash, who put it on his album Gone Girl.

It was Rogers, however, who made the song a mainstream success. His version was a No. 1 country hit, and made its way to the pop charts at a time when country songs rarely crossed over. It was released in November 1978 as the title track from his album The Gambler, and won him the Grammy Award for Best Male Country Vocal Performance in 1980. Rogers is accompanied on the recording by the vocal group The Jordanaires.

In 2006, Schlitz featured in Rogers' career retrospective documentary The Journey, in which he praised both Rogers' and producer Larry Butler's contributions to the song, stating "they added several ideas that were not mine, including the new guitar intro".

Content
The lyrics describe a narrator meeting a gambler one evening while riding aimlessly on a train. The gambler can tell from the look on the narrator's face that he is in poor circumstances and offers him advice in exchange for a drink of whisky. After the narrator obliges with the whisky and a cigarette, the gambler describes his outlook on life using poker metaphors:

Every situation, says the gambler, can be played for better or worse. The trick is to recognize what is worth keeping, choose one's battles, and not dwell on losses. The gambler then falls asleep and passes away, leaving the narrator to ponder his wisdom.

Inspiration
On the American Top 40 radio program of February 3, 1979, Casey Kasem reported that Schlitz said of "The Gambler": "Something more than me wrote that song. I'm convinced of that. I really had no idea where the song was coming from. There was something going through my head, which was my father. It was just a song, and it somehow filtered through me. Six weeks later I received the final verse. Months later it came to me that it was inspired by, and possibly a gift from, my father." Schlitz's father had died in 1976.

Chart performance

Weekly charts

Year-end charts

Certifications

Legacy
The song became Rogers's signature song and most enduring hit. It was one of five consecutive songs by Rogers to hit No. 1 on the Billboard country music charts. On the pop chart, the song made it to No. 16, and No. 3 on the Easy Listening chart. 
It inspired a series of TV movies loosely inspired by the song and set in the Old West, starting with Kenny Rogers as The Gambler (1980) and followed by Kenny Rogers as The Gambler: The Adventure Continues (1983), Kenny Rogers as The Gambler, Part III: The Legend Continues (1987), The Gambler Returns: The Luck of the Draw (1991), and Gambler V: Playing for Keeps (1994).

As of November 13, 2013, the digital sales of the single stood at 798,000 copies and after all these years the single has yet to be certified gold by RIAA certifications. In 2018, it was selected for preservation in the National Recording Registry by the Library of Congress as being "culturally, historically, or artistically significant". The song was ranked number 18 out of the top 76 songs of the 1970s by Internet radio station WDDF Radio in their 2016 countdown.
Following Rogers' death on March 20, 2020, "The Gambler" soared to No. 1 on Billboard's Digital Song Sales chart, followed by "Islands in the Stream", with Dolly Parton, which debuted at No. 2.

In popular culture

Sports
 The Houston Gamblers of the United States Football League, who played in Rogers' hometown, were named after the song.
 Former Major League Baseball pitcher Kenny Rogers was nicknamed "The Gambler" after the song, due to sharing a name with the song's artist.
The song is the unofficial 'anthem' for Edinburgh University Men's Hockey Club, where the club are colloquially called "The Gamblers".
 The song is used by American Darts player Danny Baggish as his walk-on music as he is nicknamed "The Gambler"

Television 
 In 1979, when Rogers guest-starred in a season 4 episode of The Muppet Show, he performed this song with a Muppet character. Rogers is shown seated on a train with three Muppets, one of them The Gambler (portrayed by Jerry Nelson). Rogers sings the opening verse, while Nelson sings most of "The Gambler's" dialog, then falls asleep just as Rogers concludes the song's story. After he dies, The Gambler's spirit rises from his Muppet body, singing backup and dances to the song's last two choruses, and lets a deck of cards fly from his hand before fading away.
 A caricature parody of Kenny Rogers singing the song appeared in the 1993 Pinky and the Brain short "Bubba Bo Bob Brain" (season 1, episode 34). The lyrics to this version were changed to refer to Go Fish: "You gotta know how to cut 'em, know how to shuffle, know how to deal the cards before you play fish with me."
In the series King of the Hill, “The Gambler” is repeatedly shown to be one of lead character Hank Hill's favorite songs.
 In the 2007 episode of The Office "Beach Games," Kevin Malone sings the verses of the song in the bus while the rest of the staff joins him for the chorus. This was a nod to Kevin's gambling problem.

Other 
 Country Yossi parodied the song in the 1980s on his Wanted album as "The Rabbi".
 On July 21, 2009, the song was released for the music game Rock Band as a playable track as part of the "Rock Band Country Track Pack" compilation disc. It was made available via digital download on at the end of 2009.
 A 2014 Geico television commercial features Rogers singing part of the song a cappella during a card game, to the displeasure of the other players.
 In the 2016 video game Phoenix Wright: Ace Attorney – Spirit of Justice, this happens on one occasion in the game's fifth case: If Apollo Justice presents the wrong evidence, Phoenix recounts something about a gambler singing the first part of the chorus, after which the judge chimes in that he likes the song before singing the rest of the chorus. Apollo, embarrassed, thinks, "I don't know what's worse: the penalty, or their singing."

References

External links
 Lyrics of this song
 

1978 singles
1978 songs
Bobby Bare songs
Johnny Cash songs
Kenny Rogers songs
Songs written by Don Schlitz
Song recordings produced by Larry Butler (producer)
United Artists Records singles
United States National Recording Registry recordings
Works about poker
Songs about luck